Björkborn Manor is a manor house and the very last residence of Alfred Nobel in Sweden. The manor is located in Karlskoga Municipality, Örebro County, Sweden. The current-standing white-colored manor house was built in the 1810s, but the history of the property is older.

Björkborn Manor is the site of an Alfred Nobel museum. It had a role in the process of the creation of the Nobel Prize and the Nobel Foundation.

Björkborn is located within a park-like garden, that is bordered by a river to the west and south, and by an industrial area to the north.

History

First house on the site 
Established as an ironworks in 1639, by Mårten Drost. Crispin Flygge acquired the property in the 1670s, then passed it over to his widow, . In 1703, Björkborn was acquired by Jakob Christiansson Robsahm. 

The former-standing manor was built in the 17th century. It included a park-like garden, but which plants were grown is unknown. The Björkborn Ironworks was wound down in 1901.

The ironworks was powered by the surrounding waterfalls.

Current-standing house 
The current manor was completed in 1814 with the purpose of serving as residence for the family who owned Björkborn Ironworks. Robsahm's descendants resided at the property until the 19th century. After the Robsahm era was over, it was acquired by Olof Philip Oxehufvud. In 1873, K.G. Oxehufvud sold the properties to the Bofors-Gullspång company.

Few remains are preserved of the ironworks. 

Over the years, the manor has served as residence for members of various prominent Swedish families, e.g. the Robsahm, Geijer, Lagerhjelm, Mitander, Oxehufvud and Myhrman families.

Alfred Nobel 

During the summers of 1894–1896 Alfred Nobel lived in the manor house Björkborn. Even though he died in his villa in Sanremo, Italy and had a home in Paris, it was decided that his residence was at Björkborn in Karlskoga. This allowed Nobel’s will to be adjudicated in Karlskoga. The manor was included in the purchase when Alfred Nobel acquired Bofors-Gullspång in 1894. The manor served as the very last residence of Alfred Nobel in Sweden.

Before he had moved in, his nephew, Hjalmar Nobel, conducted a renovation of the building.

The creation of the Nobel Foundation was led from Björkborn Manor by Ragnar Sohlman.

A major part of Alfred Nobel’s private library is still preserved at this site.

Museum (1970s to present day) 

In 1978, the Nobel Museum opened at Björkborn. The site hosts a science center, an exhibition on the Nobel Prize and an industry museum on the history of Bofors. The site has around 10,000 annual visitors. 

The museum offers dramatized guided tours to the public.

Conferences can also be hosted at this location.

Official visits 
In 1895, the then King of Sweden, Oscar II, visited Björkborn.

The current King and Queen of Sweden, Carl XVI Gustaf and Silvia, visited Björkborn Manor in 2013 during their official visit to Örebro County.

See also 

 Bofors
 Björkborn Bridge
 List of castles and palaces in Sweden
 Nobel Laboratory
 Nobel Prize Museum

Notes

References

Further reading

External links 

 Official website 
 

Buildings and structures completed in the 19th century
Alfred Nobel
Buildings and structures in Karlskoga Municipality
Manor houses in Sweden
Biographical museums in Sweden
Museums in Örebro County

Industry museums in Sweden
Houses completed in 1814
Bofors